Arditti is a surname. Notable people with the surname include:

Irvine Arditti (born 1953), English violinist
 Lior Arditti (born 1977), Israeli basketball player
Michael Arditti, English writer
Paul Arditti, British sound designer
Philip Arditti (born 1979), British actor
Rita Arditti (1934–2009), Argentine writer
Robert Arditti (born 1946), English actor

See also
Arditi (disambiguation)